Dr. Sajal K. Das is currently a Professor of Computer Science and the Daniel St. Clair Endowed Chair at Missouri University of Science and Technology (S&T), where he was the Chair of Computer Science Department during 2013-2017. Prior to that he was a University Distinguished Scholar Professor of Computer Science and Engineering and the founding director of the Center for Research in Wireless Mobility and Networking (CReWMaN) at the University of Texas at Arlington. During 2008-2011 he served the US National Science Foundation as a Program Director in Computer Networks and Systems division of the CISE Directorate. During 1988-1999 he was a faculty at the University of North Texas. His research interests include wireless and sensor networks, mobile and pervasive computing, parallel and cloud computing, smart and connected communities (smart city, smart home, smart grid, smart health, smart transportation, and smart agriculture), cyber-physical systems, Internet of Things (IoT), cyber-physical security, machine learning and data analytics, biological and social networking, applied graph theory and game theory. He has partaken in research related to wireless sensor networks and pervasive and mobile computing. He is a Fellow of the IEEE.

Publications, patents and books
Das has published 350+ journal articles and 475+ peer-reviewed conference papers, gathering 34,300+ citations according to Google Scholar and 50 invited book chapters.
He is one of the most prolific authors in computer science according to DBLP His current h-index is 91.

Books
 S. Roy and S. K. Das, Principles of Cyber-Physical Systems: An Interdisciplinary Approach, Cambridge University Press, 2020.
 S. K. Das, K. Kant and N. Zhang, Handbook on Securing Cyber-Physical Critical Infrastructure: Foundations and Challenges, Morgan Kaufmann, 2012.
 J. Cao and S. K. Das, Mobile Agents in Networking and Distributed Computing (Wiley Series in Agent Technology), John Wiley, 2012.
 D. J. Cook and S. K. Das, Smart Environments: Technology, Protocols and Applications, John Wiley, 2005.

References

External links
Sajal K. Das personal webpage
Creative Research in Wireless Mobility and Networking (CReWMaN) website
Sajal K. Das academic ancestry

Year of birth missing (living people)
Living people
Electrical engineering academics
American computer scientists
Academic journal editors
University of Calcutta alumni
Indian Institute of Science alumni
Missouri University of Science and Technology faculty